Brandon Farmelo (born March 1, 2002) is an American soccer player who played as a midfielder for Colorado Springs Switchbacks in the USL Championship and the Colorado Rapids academy

References

External links
Profile at US Development Academy

2002 births
Living people
Colorado Springs Switchbacks FC players
American soccer players
Association football midfielders
Soccer players from Colorado
USL Championship players